Eddisbury is a constituency in Cheshire represented in the House of Commons of the UK Parliament since 2019 by Edward Timpson, a Conservative.

From 2015 to 2019 it was represented by Antoinette Sandbach, a former Conservative member who had the whip removed on 3 September 2019 and joined the Liberal Democrats on 31 October 2019.

History 
The constituency was first created as one of eight single-member divisions of Cheshire under the Redistribution of Seats Act 1885, having previously been part of the larger 2-member Western Division of Cheshire. It was named for the former hundred of Eddisbury and constituted a largely rural area, including Frodsham, Tarporley, Malpas and Audlem. It also included non-resident freeholders of the Parliamentary Borough of Chester.

Under the Representation of the People Act 1948, the seat was abolished for the 1950 general election, being distributed to the constituencies of Crewe, Northwich, Runcorn and City of Chester.

It was re-constituted following the reorganisation of local authorities in 1974 by the Third Periodic Review of Westminster constituencies for the 1983 general election, with much of the constituency comprising areas covered by the previous version of the seat, transferred from the abolished constituencies of Nantwich, Northwich and Runcorn.

Constituency profile
The constituency is mostly rural, covering the south-west of Cheshire, noted in minerals for salt mining and within easy access to the cities of Liverpool, Manchester and the industrial and manufacturing centres of the Wirral Peninsula and Deeside.  To the east of the seat lies part of Delamere Forest.  The main town in the constituency is Winsford; other main settlements include Tarvin, Audlem, Kelsall, Malpas and Tarporley.

Boundaries 

1885–1918: The Municipal Borough of the City of Chester, the Sessional Division of Broxton, and parts of the Sessional Divisions of Chester Castle, Eddisbury, Nantwich, and Northwich.

1918–1950: The Urban District of Tarporley, the Rural Districts of Malpas and Tarvin, in the Rural District of Northwich the civil parishes of Crowton, Cuddington, Darnhall, Delamere, Eddisbury, Little Budworth, Marton, Oakmere, and Wimboldsley, in the Rural District of Runcorn the civil parishes of Alvanley, Frodsham, Frodsham Lordship, Helsby, Kingsley, Kingswood, Mauley, Newton-by-Frodsham, and Norley, and part of the Rural District of Nantwich.

Minor losses, largely to the enlarged constituency of City of Chester, including Hoole.

On abolition, areas comprising part of the Rural District of Nantwich were transferred to Crewe; areas comprising the Rural District of Tarvin (incorporating the abolished Urban District of Tarporley and the Rural District of Malpas) transferred to Northwich; and small areas also transferred to the City of Chester and to the new County Constituency of Runcorn (including Frodsham).

1983–1997: The District of Vale Royal wards of Church, Cuddington and Marton, Davenham and Moulton, Forest, Frodsham East, Frodsham North West, Frodsham South, Gorst Wood, Gravel, Hartford, Helsby Central, Helsby North, Helsby South and Alvanley Ward, Kingsley, Mara, Milton, Oulton, Over One, Over Two, Swanlow, Tarporley, Vale Royal, Weaver, and Wharton, and the City of Chester wards of Barrow, Farndon, Malpas, Tarvin, Tattenhall, Tilston, and Waverton.

Comprised areas transferred from the abolished constituencies of Nantwich (including Malpas and Winsford), Northwich (including Cuddington and Weaverham) and Runcorn (including Frodsham and Helsby).

1997–2010: The District of Vale Royal wards of Cuddington and Marton, Davenham and Moulton, Gravel, Mara, Oulton, Over One, Over Two, Swanlow, Tarporley, Vale Royal, and Wharton, the Borough of Crewe and Nantwich wards of Acton, Audlem, Bunbury, Combermere, Minshull, Peckforton, and Wrenbury, and the City of Chester wards of Barrow, Farndon, Malpas, Tarvin, Tattenhall, Tilston, and Waverton.

Gained western parts of Crewe and Nantwich, including Audlem. Northern areas, including Frodsham and Helsby, transferred to the new constituency of Weaver Vale.

2010–2019: The Parliamentary Constituencies (England) Order 2007 defined the boundaries as:

The Borough of Vale Royal wards of Cuddington and Oakmere, Davenham and Moulton, Mara, Tarporley and Oulton, Winsford Dene, Winsford Gravel, Winsford Over, Winsford Swanlow, Winsford Verdin, and Winsford Wharton, the Borough of Crewe and Nantwich wards of Acton, Audlem, Bunbury, Minshull, Peckforton, and Wrenbury, and the City of Chester wards of Barrow, Farndon, Kelsall, Malpas, Tarvin, Tattenhall, Tilston, and Waverton.

Minor boundary changes, primarily due to local authority boundary changes.

However, before the new boundaries came into force for the 2010 election, the districts making up the county of Cheshire were abolished on 1 April 2009, being replaced by four unitary authorities. Consequently, the constituency's boundaries became:

The Cheshire West and Chester wards of: Chester Villages (part), Davenham & Moulton (part), Farndon (part), Gowy (part), Malpas, Tarporley, Tarvin & Kelsall, Tattenhall, Weaver & Cuddington (part), Winsford Over & Verdin (part), Winford Swanlow & Dene, and Winsford Wharton, and the Cheshire East wards of Audlem, Brereton Rural (part), Bunbury, Leighton (part), and Wrenbury.

2019–present: Following a further local government ward boundary review in 2019, the boundaries are currently:

The Cheshire West and Chester wards of Christleton & Huntington (part), Davenham, Moulton & Kingsmead (part), Farndon (part), Gowy Rural (part), Malpas, Sandstone (part), Tarporley, Tarvin & Kelsall, Tattenhall, Weaver & Cuddington (part), Winsford Dene, Winsford Gravel, Winsford Over & Verdin (part), Winford Swanlow, and Winsford Wharton, and the Cheshire East wards of Audlem, Brereton Rural (part), Bunbury, Leighton (part), and Wrenbury.

Political history (current constituency) 
Since the constituency was re-established in 1983, it had always been held by a Conservative, until September 2019.

Between 1983 and 1999, it was represented by Alastair Goodlad, who resigned upon being appointed the United Kingdom's High Commissioner to Australia. The ensuing by-election was won by Stephen O'Brien, who held the seat until 2015. Antoinette Sandbach was elected in 2015, and re-elected in 2017.

The closest the Labour Party has come to winning the seat was in the 1997 general election, when the Conservative majority was reduced to just 1,185. Eddisbury consists of mainly rural villages and small towns which are favourable to the Conservative party; Labour's only strength is in the constituency's largest town, Winsford, which currently has the seat's only local councillors.  Labour fell from second to third place in the 2010 general election—the Conservative candidate held  the seat with a majority of over 13,000 and a Liberal Democrat moved into second place. The 2015 election saw Labour move back into second place, and the Conservative majority fell by 1.8%.

In 2019, the sitting MP, Antoinette Sandbach had the whip withdrawn following a mass Conservative rebellion intended to prevent a no-deal Brexit, resulting in the seat becoming Independent before defecting to the Liberal Democrats on 31 October 2019. She stood at the December 2019 general election for the Liberal Democrats, but was beaten into third place, with the Conservative candidate, Edward Timpson, achieving a majority of 34.8% over Labour. Edward Timpson was previously the Conservative MP for Crewe and Nantwich constituency until the 2017 General Election, after which Crewe and Nantwich briefly switched to Labour with Laura Smith until 2019, before switching back to the Conservatives with Kieran Mullan.

Members of Parliament

Elections

Elections in the 2010s

Elections in the 2000s

Elections in the 1990s

Elections in the 1980s

Election results 1885–1945

Elections in the 1940s 

General Election 1939–40:

Another general election was required to take place before the end of 1940. The political parties had been making preparations for an election to take place from 1939 and by the end of this year, the following candidates had been selected; 
Liberal National: R. J. Russell 
Liberal: William Gretton Ward

Elections in the 1930s

Elections in the 1920s

Elections in the 1910s 

General Election 1914–15:
Another General Election was required to take place before the end of 1915. The political parties had been making preparations for an election to take place and by July 1914, the following candidates had been selected; 
Unionist: Harry Barnston
Liberal: Hayward

Elections in the 1900s

Elections in the 1890s

Elections in the 1880s

See also 

 List of parliamentary constituencies in Cheshire
History of parliamentary constituencies and boundaries in Cheshire

Notes

References
Specific

General
Craig, F. W. S. (1983). British parliamentary election results 1918–1949 (3 ed.). Chichester: Parliamentary Research Services. .

Parliamentary constituencies in Cheshire
Constituencies of the Parliament of the United Kingdom established in 1885
Constituencies of the Parliament of the United Kingdom disestablished in 1950
Constituencies of the Parliament of the United Kingdom established in 1983